Canning is an unincorporated community in Hughes County, in the U.S. state of South Dakota.

History
Canning was platted in 1884. The community was named for George Canning, a British statesman who served as Prime Minister of the United Kingdom. A post office was established as Canning in 1883, and remained in operation until it was discontinued in 1972.

References

Unincorporated communities in Hughes County, South Dakota
Unincorporated communities in South Dakota